Dave Williams (born 29 January 1989) is an English rugby league footballer who plays for the London Skolars in League 1, as a . He is also the captain of the London Skolars.

Background
Williams was born in London, England.

Career
He signed a new 2-year deal to start from the 2009 season.

References

External links
London Skolars profile
Harlequins Rugby League profile
Youngsters called up to face Wigan

1989 births
Living people
English rugby league players
Featherstone Rovers players
Keighley Cougars players
London Broncos players
London Skolars players
Rugby league players from London
Rugby league props